John Charles Griffin is a New Zealand rugby league footballer who represented  the New Zealand national rugby league team.

Playing career
A West Coast representative, Griffin represented the South Island in 1976 in a match against Sydney Metropolitan.

Griffin was the West Coast Rugby League player of the year in 1982. Griffin was selected for the New Zealand national rugby league team in 1982, and earned 1 cap, becoming Kiwi number 569.

References

Living people
New Zealand rugby league players
New Zealand national rugby league team players
West Coast rugby league team players
Year of birth missing (living people)